Judge Wilkins may refer to:

Philip Charles Wilkins (1913–1998), judge of the United States District Court for the Eastern District of California
Robert L. Wilkins (born 1963), judge of the United States Court of Appeals for the District of Columbia Circuit
Ross Wilkins (1799–1872), judge of the United States District Courts for the District of Michigan and for the Eastern District of Michigan
William Wilkins (American politician) (1779–1865), judge of the United States District Court for the Western District of Pennsylvania
William Walter Wilkins (born 1942), judge of the United States Court of Appeals for the Fourth Circuit

See also
Robert Nugen Wilkin (1886–1973), judge of the United States District Court for the Northern District of Ohio
Justice Wilkins (disambiguation)